João Pedro da Silva Pereira (born 25 February 1984) is a Portuguese former professional footballer who played mainly as a right-back.

An attacking wingback, he was also known for his fiery temperament that led to altercations with adversary players and referees numerous times. In his country, he represented both Benfica and Sporting CP, amassing Primeira Liga totals of 232 matches and nine goals and winning the 2005 national championship with the former. He also spent two and a half seasons in Spain with Valencia and four in Turkey with Trabzonspor, winning the 2019–20 Turkish Cup before returning to Sporting in February 2021, where he again won the domestic league.

Internationally, Pereira represented Portugal at Euro 2012 and the 2014 World Cup.

Club career

Benfica
Pereira was born in Lisbon. A product of local S.L. Benfica's youth system, he first appeared with its first team on 17 August 2003 in a 0–0 away draw against Boavista FC, and finished his debut season with 25 Primeira Liga appearances, mostly as a midfielder.

Pereira was part of the Benfica squad that won the 2005 championship, starting often, until a fallout with coach Ronald Koeman relegated him to the bench and later to the B side. He was sold to Gil Vicente F.C. – also in the top flight – in the summer of 2006, after a previous loan to the same club.

Braga
In 2007–08, fully reconverted into a right back, Pereira joined S.C. Braga, as another player in the position, Luís Filipe, went the other way.

An undisputed starter from the beginning, he scored his first goal for the Minho side on 22 February 2009, a 2–1 last-minute winner at Associação Naval 1º de Maio. He also collected a total of 17 yellow cards and two red in his first two seasons.

Sporting CP
On 22 December 2009, Pereira moved to Sporting CP for a fee of €3 million; at the time, Braga led the league alongside Benfica with 12 points in advance to his new club, with the Lions eventually finishing fourth.

Pereira again featured regularly for Sporting in the 2010–11 campaign, both as a defender and a midfielder, as his team ranked in third position. On 30 April 2011, he scored in a 2–1 home victory over Portimonense S.C. but was also sent off midway through the second half (after teammate André Santos) for repeatedly and severely insulting referee Duarte Gomes.

Valencia

On 24 May 2012, Pereira signed with Valencia CF in Spain for €3.6 million, penning a 3+1 contract. He made his official debut on 19 August, playing the full 90 minutes in a 1–1 away draw against Real Madrid.

Pereira was a starter in his first two years with the Che but, after the arrival of manager Nuno Espírito Santo for 2014–15, was relegated to third-choice right-back.

Hannover
In the January 2015 transfer window, Pereira signed for Bundesliga club Hannover 96 until the end of the season. He made his league debut on 7 February, playing the second half of a 1–2 away loss to Hamburger SV.

Return to Sporting
On 13 July 2015, Pereira returned to Sporting on a two-year deal with a €45 million buyout clause, as a replacement for Southampton-bound Cédric Soares. He made his debut on 9 August, featuring the full 90 minutes as they beat Benfica 1–0 to lift the Supertaça Cândido de Oliveira at the Estádio Algarve. Thirteen days later he received his third red card for the club – all direct – for conceding a penalty in a 1–1 home draw against F.C. Paços de Ferreira.

Trabzonspor
In December 2016, Pereira was coveted by Trabzonspor, who were told to pay at least €1.5 million for his signature. Early in the new year, he cancelled his contract that was due to expire in the summer and joined the Süper Lig club.

Pereira played four matches in the 2019–20 Turkish Cup, including the entire 2–0 final win over Alanyaspor. On 25 January 2021, he left the Şenol Güneş Stadium as a free agent.

Third Sporting stint
On 1 February 2021, shortly before his 37th birthday, Pereira returned to Sporting on a short-term deal; it was agreed that at its conclusion he would remain at the club as a coach.

International career
Pereira was first called to the Portugal senior team in October 2010, following the appointment of new coach Paulo Bento. He made his debut in a UEFA Euro 2012 qualifier against Denmark, and also started in the following match – in the same competition – in Iceland, with the national side winning both games 3–1.

On 19 May 2014, Pereira was named in the final 23-man squad for the 2014 FIFA World Cup. In the first game, against Germany, he committed a penalty on Mario Götze that resulted in the first goal scored by Thomas Müller, in an eventual 0–4 loss.

Career statistics

Club

International

Honours
Benfica
Primeira Liga: 2004–05
Taça de Portugal: 2003–04
Supertaça Cândido de Oliveira: 2005

Braga
UEFA Intertoto Cup: 2008

Sporting CP
Primeira Liga: 2020–21
Supertaça Cândido de Oliveira: 2015

Trabzonspor
Turkish Cup: 2019–20

References

External links

1984 births
Living people
Footballers from Lisbon
Portuguese footballers
Association football defenders
Association football midfielders
Primeira Liga players
Liga Portugal 2 players
Segunda Divisão players
S.L. Benfica B players
S.L. Benfica footballers
Gil Vicente F.C. players
S.C. Braga players
Sporting CP footballers
La Liga players
Valencia CF players
Bundesliga players
Hannover 96 players
Süper Lig players
Trabzonspor footballers
Portugal youth international footballers
Portugal under-21 international footballers
Portugal B international footballers
Portugal international footballers
UEFA Euro 2012 players
2014 FIFA World Cup players
Portuguese expatriate footballers
Expatriate footballers in Spain
Expatriate footballers in Germany
Expatriate footballers in Turkey
Portuguese expatriate sportspeople in Spain
Portuguese expatriate sportspeople in Germany
Portuguese expatriate sportspeople in Turkey